Call of the Rockies is a 1938 American Western film directed by Alan James, starring Charles Starrett, Donald Grayson, and Iris Meredith.

Cast
 Charles Starrett as Clint Buckley
 Donald Grayson as Slim Grayson
 Iris Meredith as Ann Bradford
 Dick Curtis as Matt Stark
 Edward LeSaint as Judge Stockton
 Edmund Cobb as Barlow
 Art Mix as Trigger
 John Tyrrell as Swale
 George Chesebro as Monk
 Glenn Strange as Kelso
 Sons of the Pioneers
 Alan Bridge as Weston
 Fred Burns as Murdock
 Hank Bell as Rankin

Production
The film, originally titled "Outlaws of the Big Bend", began production in the middle of January 1938. The picture was still in production in early March, and was originally scheduled for a March 30 release. However, by the middle of March, the release had been delayed until April 30. The Legion of Decency gave the film an A-1 rating, meaning they were "unobjectionable for general patronage".

Reception
The Independent Exhibitor's Film Bulletin gave the film a positive review, calling it "A nicely made formula western with music that moves at mile-a-minute clip and has sufficient action for the most ardent western fans." They complimented the acting of Starrett, Meredith and Curtis, as well as the supporting cast. They also felt the direction was good, and the singing of Grayson and the Sons of the Pioneers added to the picture.

References

American black-and-white films
American Western (genre) films
Columbia Pictures films
Films directed by Alan James
1930s American films